Heres, Herés, or   Hères may refer to:
 Heres (Gozón), one of parishes in the Gozón municipality, Asturias, Spain 
 Heres Municipality, Ciudad Bolívar, Venezuela 
 Luis Hernández Heres a Cuban former footballer 
 Hères, a commune in Hautes-Pyrénées, France  
 Hungarian name for Herendeşti village, Victor Vlad Delamarina, Timiș, Romania